The 57th Filmfare Awards were held on 29 January 2012 at Film City, Mumbai honoring the best film of 2011 from the Hindi-language film industry (commonly known as Bollywood). The ceremony was jointly hosted by Shahrukh Khan and Ranbir Kapoor. Incidentally, both of them have hosted the award ceremonies previously but with different co-hosts (Khan with Saif Ali Khan, Kapoor with Imran Khan), hence making it the first time for this pair to host the show. The 57th Filmfare awards were televised on 19 February 2012 to the public.

The nominations for the awards were announced on 11 January 2012. Zindagi Na Milegi Dobara led the ceremony with 13 nominations, followed by Rockstar with 10 nominations and Delhi Belly with 7 nominations.

Zindagi Na Milegi Dobara won 7 awards, including Best Film, Best Film (Critics), Best Director (both for Zoya Akhtar) and Best Supporting Actor (for Farhan Akhtar), thus becoming the most-awarded film at the ceremony.

The 2012 awards thus equaled 2011 (Udaan) for the maximum number of awards won by a single film, and this also marked the largest award tally for a single film since 2007 (Omkara).

2012 also marked the first time after 2010 (3 Idiots) that the film with the most nominations also won the most awards.

Ranbir Kapoor won his first Best Actor award and second Best Actor (Critics) award for his role of Janardhan / Jordan in Rockstar, while Vidya Balan won her fourth Filmfare Award and second Best Actress award for her portrayal of Silk / Reshma in The Dirty Picture (in addition to a second Best Actress nomination for her performance in No One Killed Jessica).

Awards and nominees

Main awards

Critics' awards

Technical Awards

Special awards

Multiple nominations and wins

The following films received multiple nominations.
 13 nominations: Zindagi Na Milegi Dobara
 10 nominations: Rockstar
 7 nominations: Delhi Belly
 6 nominations: The Dirty Picture
 5 nominations:  Don 2, No One Killed Jessica, Ra.One, Shaitan
 4 nominations: 7 Khoon Maaf
 3 nominations: Bodyguard

The following films received multiple awards.
 7 wins:  Zindagi Na Milegi Dobara
 5 wins: Rockstar
 3 wins: Delhi Belly,  The Dirty Picture
 2 wins: 7 Khoon Maaf, Don 2

Partners 
 Idea Cellular – Title Sponsor
 PC Jeweller – Associate Sponsor
 Sony Entertainment Television – Telecast Partner
 Black Dog – Beverage Partner
 Bright Outdoor Media – Outdoor partner
 Radio Mirchi – Radio Partner
 Big Cinemas – Multiplex Partner

References

External links
 Filmfare Official Website
 Nominations for 57th Filmfare Awards 2011 at Bollywood Hungama.

Filmfare Awards
Filmfare